Silvana Bauer (born 14 April 1986) is a Dutch former professional tennis player.

Bauer, a native of Zeeland, played in all junior grand slam tournaments and had a best ITF junior world ranking of 11. 

In 2002 she made a WTA Tour main draw appearance at the Ordina Open and toured with the Netherlands Fed Cup team for an away tie in Australia, as a reserve.

At the age of 17 she decided to give the game away to the surprise of many in Dutch tennis.

ITF finals

Singles: 1 (1–0)

References

External links
 
 

1986 births
Living people
Dutch female tennis players
Sportspeople from Zeeland
20th-century Dutch women
20th-century Dutch people
21st-century Dutch women